Li Bai or Li Bo (701–762) was a Tang dynasty Chinese poet.

Li Bo may also refer to:

Lee Bo, one of the missing booksellers of Causeway Bay Books in Hong Kong
Li Bo (ecologist) (1929–1998), Chinese phytoecologist

Sports
Li Bo (sport shooter), participated in Shooting at the 2010 Asian Games
Li Bo (footballer) for Guangxi Longguida F.C.
Li Bo (skier), Cross-country skiing at the 2010 Winter Paralympics – Men's 10 km Classic
Bo Li (athlete) from 2005 World Youth Championships in Athletics
Li Bo (referee) from 2009 Guangzhou Pharmaceutical F.C. season

See also
Libo (disambiguation)